Aleksandra Stepanović (born ) is a Serbian volleyball player. She is part of the Serbia women's national volleyball team.

She participated in the 2015 FIVB Volleyball World Grand Prix.
On club level she played for Vizura Beograd in 2015.

References

External links
http://www.scoresway.com/?sport=volleyball&page=player&id=8358
http://www.cev.lu/competition-area/PlayerDetails.aspx?TeamID=8411&PlayerID=33375&ID=679

1994 births
Living people
Serbian women's volleyball players
Place of birth missing (living people)
21st-century Serbian women